Giovanni Carlo Galli-Bibiena (August 11, 1717 - November 20, 1760), was an Italian architect and designer.

He was the son of Francesco Galli Bibiena and a member of the Galli da Bibiena family of artists. He was a member of the Accademia Clementina in Bologna.

In Bologna, he decorated the staircase of Palazzo Savini and the chapel Cappella di San Antonio in San Bartolommeo di Porta Ravegnana. Giovanni Carlo also designed a decorative scheme for the high altar of San Petronio, Bologna, for the Bolognese Pope Benedict XIV. In 1752, he was summoned by Joseph, the King of Portugal, to Lisbon, where he designed the Ópera do Tejo adjoining the royal palace, but the opera house was destroyed seven months after completion by the 1755 earthquake. Giovanni Carlo Galli-Bibiena died in Lisbon.

Notes

1717 births
1760 deaths
18th-century Italian architects
People of Tuscan descent
Architects from Bologna